Club Deportivo Azuaga is a Spanish football team based in Azuaga, in the autonomous community of Extremadura. Founded in 1952, it currently plays in Tercera División – Group 14, holding home games at Estadio Municipal de Deportes, which has a capacity of 1,500 people.

History 
The football history of Azuaga dates back to 1917, when the Racing Club Arsense de Azuaga was created, being the fourth city in Extremadura to create a football team after Badajoz, Cáceres and Mérida. In the 2018-19 season the club finished 8th in Tercera División, Group 14 with 14 wins, 9 draws and 15 losses in the 38 league games.

Season to season

17 seasons in Tercera División

References

External links
Official website 
Arefepedia team profile 

Football clubs in Extremadura
Association football clubs established in 1952
1952 establishments in Spain
Province of Badajoz